Wakiva may refer to:

Ships 
 Wakiva I, a large pleasure and cruising yacht owned by Marcellus Hartley Dodge, Sr. used in 1906 to visit the Caribbean and South America
 USS Wakiva II (SP-160), first generation ship, destroyed in World War I
 Wakiva, second generation ship, commissioned by Harkness Edwards and launched June 1938 by Jakobson Shipyard